Stefano Spremberg (born 24 March 1965) is an Italian lightweight rower. He won a gold medal at the 1985 World Rowing Championships in Hazewinkel with the lightweight men's eight.

References

External links
 

1965 births
Italian male rowers
World Rowing Championships medalists for Italy
Living people
Rowers of Fiamme Oro
Rowers from Milan